Oneword Radio was a British commercial digital radio station featuring books, drama, comedy, children's programming, and discussion. The station was available in the UK via digital radio (DAB) and digital television (Freeview DVB-T and Sky Digital DVB-S) and was streamed on the internet 24 hours a day worldwide. It was launched on 2 May 2000.

Ownership was shared between UBC Media Group and Channel 4 between early 2005 and December 2007. In October 2005, Channel 4 increased its stake to a majority by buying 51% of Oneword for £1 million. At 7.30 on weekday mornings, Oneword carried the Channel 4 Radio daily news broadcast The Morning Report, which was produced by the Channel 4 news team.

Virgin Media removed OneWord from its ex-NTL cable channel lineup on 4 October 2007. Oneword was not on its ex-Telewest lineup at the time.

In December 2007, Channel 4 decided to withdraw its funding, selling its share back to UBC Media Group for £1. All programming was replaced by repeats of previous output. On 1 January 2008 the remaining staff were dismissed. Oneword ceased broadcasting on DAB on Friday 11 January 2008.

After broadcasting ended, birdsong was broadcast on the channel until a permanent replacement, Amazing Radio, came on air on 1 June 2009. It has been claimed that the audience for the station was higher while the birdsong was playing than when the station was broadcasting normally.

References

Defunct radio stations in the United Kingdom
Digital-only radio stations
Radio stations established in 2000
Radio stations disestablished in 2008
Channel 4 Radio